Wallace Menezes dos Santos (born 23 June 1998), commonly known as Wallace, is a Brazilian footballer who plays as a midfielder for Bosnian footabll club Velež Mostar.

Career statistics

Club

References

1998 births
Living people
Brazilian footballers
Association football midfielders
Campeonato Brasileiro Série D players
2. Liga (Austria) players
Austrian Regionalliga players
Croatian Football League players
Club Sportivo Sergipe players
Fluminense FC players
Grêmio Foot-Ball Porto Alegrense players
Sport Club Internacional players
SC Austria Lustenau players
HNK Gorica players
Brazilian expatriate footballers
Brazilian expatriate sportspeople in Austria
Expatriate footballers in Austria
Brazilian expatriate sportspeople in Croatia
Expatriate footballers in Croatia